W. A. "Winkie" Wilkins is a  Democratic member of the North Carolina General Assembly. He represented the 2nd House District (including constituents in Granville and Person counties) from January 2013 until December 2014. Citing his health, Wilkins announced in 2014 that he would not seek another term in the legislature.

Previously, before legislative redistricting, Wilkins represented the 55th House district from 2004 through 2012. That district included constituents in Durham and Person counties.

Electoral history

2012

2010

2008

2006

2004

References

External links
North Carolina General Assembly - Representative W.A. (Winkie) Wilkins official NC House website
 Raleigh News & Observer profile
Project Vote Smart - Representative W. A. 'Winkie' Wilkins (NC) profile
Follow the Money - Winkie Wilkins
2008 2006 2004 campaign contributions

|-

1941 births
Living people
People from Roxboro, North Carolina
Baptists from North Carolina
Democratic Party members of the North Carolina House of Representatives
21st-century American politicians